{{Infobox automobile
| name = GAZ Sobol
| image = GAZ SOBOL SOBKOR.JPG
| caption = 
| manufacturer = Gorky Automobile Plant
| aka = 
| production = 1998–current
| assembly = 
| predecessor = 
| successor = 
| class = Light commercial vehicle
| body_style = truck minibus
| wheelbase = 
| length = 
| width = 
| height = 
| layout = FR layout
| engine = {{ubl|
  | Petrol:
  | 2.3 L ZMZ-406 I4
  | 2.4 L Chrysler 2.4L DOHC I4
  | 2.46 L ZMZ-405 Straight-4
  | 2.5 L ZMZ-402 I4
  | 2.9 L UMZ-4216 I4
  | Diesel:
  | 2.1 L GAZ-560 I4
  | 2.1 L GAZ-5601/5602 turbo I4
  | 2.8 L Cummins ISF2.8s4129P I4
  }}
| transmission = 5-speed manual
| platform = 
| sp = 
}}
The GAZ Sobol (Russian Соболь'' for Sable) is a series of Russian light-duty trucks, vans and minivans, produced by the Gorky Automobile Plant from November 1998. GAZ refers to the Sobol as a minivan.

History

At the end of 1998 GAZ based the Sobol on the Gazelle (class LCV -MC), GAZ shortened the GaZelle to a 2760 mm wheelbase, gave it a spring independent front suspension and a pent-tire rear axle, and designed it for a smaller capacity (up to 900 kg).

The family includes all-metal wagon GAZ-2752 and minibuses GAZ-2217 and GAZ-22171 ("Barguzine"), as well as flatbed truck (chassis cab) GAZ-2310.

Minibus GAZ-22171 with high roof (similar height "Gazelle" GAZ-3221) in the 6 and 10-seat versions. Since 1999 began production of the model 2217 "Sable Barguzine" with "low" roof (height reduced by 100 mm), lift gate back door, positioned by the manufacturer as a minivan. For business purposes and taxis designed 10-seat modification of GAZ-22173 with a more dense layout and simplified trim (available on request).

In the family of "Sable" and provided GAZ-23107/27527/22177/221717 all-wheel-drive version with rigid front axle and universal joints (joints Gukka) to drive forward driving and steering wheels. Transmission is made with permanent four-wheel drive transfer case with a chain driven mnogozvenchatoy Morse.

In early 2003 the family "Sobol" has undergone restyling, a similar family of "Gazelle" with the redesign of feathers and replacing the rectangular headlights on modern headlight unit teardrop shape, as well as the replacement of the instrument panel and so on.

In the 2006 assembly of the truck, "Sobol" GAZ-2310, before that produces only small quantities, was translated into a string of conveyor with side "Gazelle" GAZ-3302, significantly increasing the production of this model in demand, particularly in Moscow, because of restrictions on entry into the city center car carrying capacity of 1.0 tons.

In February 2010, GAZ began production restyling of the "Sobol-Business" family with a package of upgraded components and assemblies, the same family of " Business Gazelle ".

Since the end of 2010 "Sable-Business" also received a turbo Cummins ISF 2.8, since July 2010, is set to "Business Gazelle". Production of models lined the sample in 2003 and partially modernized units called "Sable-Standard" are stored only on a limited basis for modification of special purpose, certified for law enforcement agencies of the Russian Federation.

Lineup
 GAZ-2217 - minivan, "Sobol Barguzine" at 7 or 11 seats, with a low roof and lift gate back door;
 GAZ-22177 - minivan, "Sobol Barguzine" 4x4;
 GAZ-22171 - minibus "Sobol" M1 and M2 for 7 or 11 seats with standard roof (1.5m) and hinged rear swing doors;
 GAZ-221712 - Ambulance with low roof
 GAZ-221717 - minibus "Sobol" M1 and M2 4x4
 GAZ-2310 - flatbed truck (4x2) carrying capacity of 0.9 tons, the option - chassis cab for the installation of add-ons such as wagon-box;
 GAZ-23107 - flatbed truck with 4x4 wheel drive transmission;
 GAZ-2752 - panelvan carrying capacity of 0.8 tonnes with a sliding side door and rear double-doors, Option al combi for 7 persons with isolated cargo compartment;
 GAZ-27527 - panelvan wagon 4x4 variant - optional combi with 7 seats;

Engines

On vehicles of the family "Sobol", as in "Gazelle", initially (until 2006) used the following engines:
 petrol engine family ZMZ-402 (working volume of 2.5 L, 8 valves), 
 Petrol engine ZMZ-406.3 (working volume 2.3 L, 16 valves) and 
 fuel-injected gasoline engine ZMZ-406 (2.3 L, 16 valves) with a capacity of 100-110 PS, and 
 available on request: GAZ-560 diesel (2.1 liter), 85 PS.

Since 2006 the Sobol uses injection engines with Euro-2 emissions:
 ZMZ 40522.10 (2.5 L, 16 valves) 140 PS and 
 GAZ-5601 turbo 95 PS,

In 2008 - fuel injected engines with Euro-3 emissions controls were: 
 ZMZ-40524.10 and 
 Chrysler DOHC 2.4L (2.4 L, 137 PS), 
 turbo-GAZ 5602 95 PS

Since 2009 the family "Sobol" is equipped with the following powerplants:
 UMP 4216.10 (2.89 liters, 115 PS), and

From autumn 2010 also comes with a turbodiesel Cummins ISF 2.8L (128 PS).

Gallery

See also

References

External links
Sobol online at wroom.ru (Russian)
GaZ's official Sobol Page (English)

GAZ Group vehicles
Vans
Pickup trucks
Cars of Russia